The Trinity Church, formerly the First Congregational Church, is a historic church in Waltham, Massachusetts. The present church building, an architecturally distinctive blend of Romanesque and Georgian Revival styling, was built in 1870 for a congregation established in 1820.  It was listed on the National Register of Historic Places in 1989.

Architecture and history
The church stands on the south side of Main Street (United States Route 20), one block west of Waltham's Central Square.  It is separated from the street by lawn, and stands opposite the Francis Buttrick Library.  Its main body is oriented north-south, with a gable roof, and a square tower rising at the northeast corner.  The main entrance is set at the base of the main block in a segmented-arch opening, and is topped by a tall Palladian window with balcony.  The tower corners are pilastered, and the tower includes a belfry stage with round-arch openings before rising to an octagonal spire.  The interior is predominantly Georgian Revival in character, the result of extensive interior and exterior alterations in 1925.  The building was built in 1870, and originally had Italianate styling, some of which is still evident in its round-arch windows and bracketed gable.

First Congregational Church was founded in 1820 as a Trinitarian congregation called the Trinitarian Congregational Church, brought about in part by schism from the Second Religious Society, which chose Unitarianism.  Its first church was located at Main and Heard Streets.  Growth in the congregation prompted construction of this larger structure in 1870 to a design by Boston-based Thomas Silloway.  The schism between the two congregations was healed in 1906, and they were reunited as the First Congregational Church.  The church was damaged by fire in 1925, while undergoing the renovations that added its Georgian features.  It became a member of the United Church of Christ when that body was formed in 1955, but withdrew in 2006 when the congregation "voted to establish itself as an independent, trans-denominational congregation," and changed its name to Trinity Church. Its current pastor is the Rev. J. Howard Cepelak.

See also
National Register of Historic Places listings in Waltham, Massachusetts

References

External links

Churches completed in 1870
19th-century United Church of Christ church buildings
United Church of Christ churches in Massachusetts
Churches on the National Register of Historic Places in Massachusetts
Churches in Waltham, Massachusetts
National Register of Historic Places in Waltham, Massachusetts